Superbon Singha Mawynn (born August 16, 1990), also known as Superbon Banchamek, is a Thai Muay Thai kickboxer fighting out of Bangkok. He is currently signed to ONE Championship. Superbon is the 2016 Kunlun Fight World Max Tournament Champion and 2018 Enfusion Live 76 8-Man Tournament Champion. As of September 2022, Combat Press ranks him as the #1 lightweight and #2 pound-for-pound kickboxer in the world, while Beyond Kick ranks him as the best lightweight and pound-for-pound kickboxer. As of October 20, 2022, he is ranked #1 in the ONE Featherweight Muay Thai rankings.

Superbon has beaten Sitthichai twice and is one of two fighters to have knocked out Giorgio Petrosyan.

Career
Superbon is a teammate of Buakaw Banchamek. More recently, he is a devoted student of Ajarn Gae, who is considered one of the world's best Muay Thai trainers.

Kunlun Fight
He started his kickboxing career in 2015 and in the same year participated in the Kunlun Fight 64-man 70 kg tournament. He finished as a semi finalist being defeated by the tournament champion Sitthichai Sitsongpeenong.

In the 2016 edition of that tournament, he avenged his loss against Sitthichai Sitsongpeenong in the quarter finals and eventually became the 70-kg champion, defeating Cedric Manhoef in the semi-finals before knocking out Jomthong Chuwattana in the final event.

Superbon participated in the 2017 Kunlun Fight World Max 70kg Tournament. He finished as the tournament runner-up after getting knocked out by Marat Grigorian in the finals.

Enfusion
On December 8, 2017, Superbon entered the one-night Enfusion Live 58 72 kg Tournament. He came up short of winning the tournament after losing to Endy Semeleer in the final round by unanimous decision.

He returned to Enfusion at Enfusion Live 76 on December 7, 2018. He went on to defeat Marouan Toutouh by unanimous decision to win the Enfusion Live 72.5 kg Tournament.

ONE Championship
After signing with ONE Championship, Superbon made his debut at ONE Championship: No Surrender on July 31, 2020, facing Sitthichai Sitsongpeenong in a trilogy fight. He went on to defeat Sitthichai by unanimous decision.

ONE Featherweight Kickboxing Champion
Superbon faced Giorgio Petrosyan for the inaugural ONE Featherweight Kickboxing World Championship at ONE Championship: First Strike on October 15, 2021. He stopped the favourite via right high-kick in the second round, becoming just the second fighter to knock out Petrosyan, as well as being crowned the first ONE Featherweight Kickboxing World Champion.

Superbon made his first title defense against Marat Grigorian at ONE: X on March 25, 2022. After dominating all five rounds, Superbon won the rematch with Grigorian and retained the ONE Featherweight Kickboxing World Championship by unanimous decision.

Superbon was scheduled to his second title defense against the 2021 ONE Featherweight Kickboxing World Grand Prix Champion Chingiz Allazov at ONE on Prime Video 2 on October 1, 2022. Allazov withdrew with an injury on September 21 and was replaced by the #5 ranked ONE lightweight contender Tayfun Özcan. Superbon withdrew from the fight the day before it was supposed to take place, as he wasn't medically cleared to compete. His fight with Allazov was rescheduled for ONE on Prime Video 5 on December 3, 2022. In turn, Superbon was forced to withdraw due to an illness and the bout was moved to headline at ONE on Prime Video 6 on January 14, 2023. He lost the bout and title via knockout in the second round.

Titles and accomplishments

Kickboxing

Professional
 Kunlun Fight  
 2016 Kunlun Fight World Max Tournament Champion
 Enfusion
 2018 Enfusion Live 76 Abu Dhabi: 8-Man Tournament Winner
 La Nuit Des Champions
 2019 La Nuit Des Champions -70 kg Champion
 International Professional Combat Council (IPCC) 
 2019 IPCC Kickboxing World -70 kg Champion (one defense) 
 ONE Championship
 ONE Featherweight Kickboxing World Championship (One time; current)
One successful title defense
 ONE Super Series Knockout of the Year 2021 
 ONE Super Series Fighter of the Year 2021

Muay Thai

Professional
 Professional Boxing Association of Thailand (PAT) 
 2010 Thailand Lightweight Champion (1 Defense)
 Muay Thai Warriors 
 2013 Muay Thai Warriors Light Middleweight Champion
 M-ONE 
 2013 M-ONE Middleweight Champion
 World Boxing Council Muaythai 
 2014 WBC Muay Thai Intercontinental Welterweight Champion

Amateur
 International Federation of Muaythai Amateur (IFMA) 
 2015 IFMA Royal World Cup Tournament Championships in Bangkok, Thailand  -71 kg
 2016 IFMA World Muaythai Championships in Jönköping, Sweden  -71 kg
 2017 IFMA World Muaythai Championships in Minsk, Belarus  -71 kg
 2017 IFMA World Muaythai at The World Games in Wroclaw, Poland  -71 kg

Awards
Combat Press
 2016 Breakout Fighter of the Year

Fight record

|-
|-  style="background:#fbb;"
| 2023-01-14 || Loss ||align=left| Chingiz Allazov || ONE Fight Night 6 || Bangkok, Thailand || KO (Punches) || 2 || 1:03    
|-
! style=background:white colspan=9 |
|-
|-  style="background:#cfc;"
| 2022-03-25|| Win ||align=left| Marat Grigorian || ONE: X || Kallang, Singapore || Decision (Unanimous) || 5 || 3:00 
|-
! style=background:white colspan=9 |
|-  style="background:#cfc;"
| 2021-10-15|| Win ||align=left| Giorgio Petrosyan || ONE Championship: First Strike || Kallang, Singapore || KO (Right High Kick) || 2 || 0:20
|-
! style=background:white colspan=9 |
|-  style="background:#cfc;"
| 2020-07-31|| Win ||align=left| Sitthichai Sitsongpeenong || ONE Championship: No Surrender || Bangkok, Thailand || Decision (Unanimous) || 3 || 3:00
|-  style="background:#cfc;"
| 2019-11-16|| Win||align=left| Wilson Varela || La Nuit Des Champions || Marseille, France || Decision  || 5 || 3:00
|-
! style=background:white colspan=9 |
|-  style="background:#cfc;"
| 2019-03-30 || Win ||align=left| Maykel Garcia || Enfusion Tenerife || Torre-Pacheco, España || Decision (Unanimous) || 3 || 3:00 
|-
! style=background:white colspan=9 |
|-  style="background:#cfc;"
| 2019-03-09|| Win ||align=left| Luis Passos || All Star Fight||Phuket, Thailand || KO (Hooks to the Body)|| 1 ||
|-  style="background:#cfc;"
| 2018-12-07 || Win ||align=left|  Marouan Toutouh || Enfusion Live 76 - 72.5kg 8 Man Tournament, Final ||  Abu Dhabi, United Arab Emirates || Decision (Unanimous) || 3 || 3:00 
|-
! style=background:white colspan=9 |
|-  style="background:#cfc;"
| 2018-12-07 || Win ||align=left| Diogo Calado || Enfusion Live 76 - 72.5kg 8 Man Tournament, Semi Finals || Abu Dhabi, United Arab Emirates || Decision (Unanimous) || 3 || 3:00 
|-
|-  style="background:#cfc;"
| 2018-12-07 || Win ||align=left| Aziz Khallah || Enfusion Live 76 - 72.5kg 8 Man Tournament, Quarter Finals ||  Abu Dhabi, United Arab Emirates || Decision (Unanimous) || 3 || 3:00 
|-
|-  style="background:#cfc;"
| 2018-09-09 || Win ||align=left|  Nayanesh Ayman|| Kunlun Fight 76 || Zhangqiu, China || Decision (Unanimous) || 3 || 3:00
|-  style="background:#cfc;"
| 2018-07-06 || Win ||align=left|  Fabian Hundt||All Star Fight 5 || Prague, Czech Republic || TKO (Four Knockdowns/Punches) || 3 || 2:20
|-  style="background:#cfc;"
| 2018-06-01 || Win ||align=left|  Dzianis Zuev|| Kunlun Fight Macau || Macau, China || Decision (Unanimous) || 3 || 3:00
|-
|-|-  style="background:#fbb;"
| 2018-02-04 || Loss ||align=left|  Marat Grigorian || Kunlun Fight 69 - World MAX 2017, Final ||  Guyang, China || KO (punch) || 1 || 0:29 
|-
! style=background:white colspan=9 |
|-  style="background:#cfc;"
| 2018-02-04 || Win ||align=left|  Sergey Kulyaba || Kunlun Fight 69 - World MAX 2017, Semi Finals ||  Guyang, China || Decision (Majority) || 3 || 3:00 
|-
|-  style="background:#fbb;"
| 2017-12-08 || Loss ||align=left|  Endy Semeleer || Enfusion Live 58 - 72kg 8 Man Tournament, Final ||  Abu Dhabi, United Arab Emirates || Decision (Unanimous) || 3 || 3:00 
|-
! style=background:white colspan=9 |
|-  style="background:#cfc;"
| 2017-12-08 || Win ||align=left| Nordin Ben Moh || Enfusion Live 58 - 72kg 8 Man Tournament, Semi Finals || Abu Dhabi, United Arab Emirates || Ext R. Decision (Unanimous) || 4 || 3:00 
|-
|-  style="background:#cfc;"
| 2017-12-08 || Win ||align=left| Regilio van Den Ent || Enfusion Live 58 - 72kg 8 Man Tournament, Quarter Finals ||  Abu Dhabi, United Arab Emirates || Decision (Unanimous) || 3 || 3:00 
|-
|-  style="background:#cfc;"
| 2017-11-12 || Win ||align=left| Davit Kiria || Kunlun Fight 67 - World MAX 2017 Final 8 || Sanya, China || Decision (Majority) || 3 || 3:00 
|-
! style=background:white colspan=9 |
|-
|-  style="background:#cfc;"
| 2017-09-30 || Win ||align=left| Mohamed Khamal || Enfusion Live 53 || Antwerp, Belgium || Decision (Unanimous) || 3 || 3:00 
|-
|-  style="background:#cfc;"
| 2017-08-27 || Win ||align=left| Nayanesh Ayman || Kunlun Fight 65 - World MAX 2017 Final 16 || Qingdao, China || Decision (Majority) || 3 || 3:00 
|-
! style=background:white colspan=9 |
|-  style="background:#cfc;"
| 2017-06-10 || Win ||align=left| Artem Pashporin || Kunlun Fight 62  || Bangkok, Thailand || Decision (Unanimous) || 3 || 3:00
|-  style="background:#cfc;"
| 2017-03-11 || Win ||align=left| Edye Ruiz || Kunlun Fight 58/ Magnum Fc 1 || Rome, Italy || Decision (Unanimous) || 3 || 3:00
|-
|-  style="background:#cfc;"
| 2017-01-01 || Win ||align=left| Jomthong Chuwattana || Kunlun Fight 56 - World Max Tournament 2016, Final || Sanya, China || KO (Right Hook) || 3 || 2:40
|-
! style=background:white colspan=9 |
|-  style="background:#cfc;"
| 2017-01-01 || Win ||align=left| Cedric Manhoef || Kunlun Fight 56 - World Max Tournament 2016, Semi Finals || Sanya, China || Decision (Unanimous) || 3 || 3:00
|-
|-  style="background:#cfc;"
| 2016-09-24 || Win ||align=left| Sitthichai Sitsongpeenong || Kunlun Fight 53 - World Max Tournament 2016 Final 8 || Beijing, China || Decision (Unanimous) || 3 || 3:00
|-
! style=background:white colspan=9 |
|-  style="background:#cfc;"
| 2016-07-31 || Win ||align=left| Khayal Dzhaniev || Kunlun Fight 48 - World Max Tournament 2016 Final 16 || Jining, China || KO (Right High Kick) || 2 || 1:19
|-
! style=background:white colspan=9 |
|-
|-  style="background:#cfc;"
| 2016-03-25 || Win ||align=left| Martin Gano || Kunlun Fight 40 - World Max 2016 Group E Tournament Final || Tongling, China || KO (Right head knee) || 2 ||1:40 
|-
! style=background:white colspan=9 |
|-  style="background:#cfc;"
| 2016-03-25 || Win ||align=left| Chen Zhicheng || Kunlun Fight 40 - World Max 2016 Group E Tournament Semi Finals || Tongling, China || KO(Left High Kick) || 3 || 2:57
|-  style="background:#cfc;"
| 2016-02-21 || Win ||align=left| Hussein Al Mansouri || Kunlun Fight 38 || Pattaya, Thailand || Decision (Unanimous) || 3 || 3:00
|-  style="background:#fbb;"
| 2016-01-23 || Loss ||align=left| Sitthichai Sitsongpeenong || Kunlun Fight 37 - World Max Tournament 2015, Semi Finals || Sanya, China || KO (Right Hook) || 2 || 0:39 
|-  style="background:#cfc;"
| 2015-12-19 || Win ||align=left| Zhang Chunyu || Kunlun Fight 35 - World Max Tournament 2015 Final 8 || Luoyang, China || KO (Left High Kick) || 2 || 1:24
|-
! style=background:white colspan=9 |
|-  style="background:#cfc;"
| 2015-11-28 || Win ||align=left| Watcharalak Orkawmuang || Super Muay Thai Workpoint || Bangkok, Thailand || Decision || 3 || 3:00 
|-  style="background:#cfc;"
| 2015-09-28 || Win ||align=left| Zheng Zhaoyu || Kunlun Fight 31 - World Max Tournament 2015 Final 16 || Bangkok, Thailand || KO (Knee to the body) || 2 || 1:03
|-
! style=background:white colspan=9 |
|-   
|-  style="background:#cfc;"
| 2015-05-15 || Win ||align=left| Deng Li || Kunlun Fight 25 - World Max 2015 Group I Tournament Final || Banská Bystrica, Slovakia || KO (Left knee to the body) || 2 || 1:38 
|-
! style=background:white colspan=9 |
|-  style="background:#cfc;"
| 2015-05-15 || Win ||align=left| Lukasz Plawecki || Kunlun Fight 25 - World Max 2015 Group I Tournament Semi Finals || Banská Bystrica, Slovakia || Decision (Unanimous) || 3 || 3:00 
|-  style="background:#cfc;"
| 2014-08-15 || Win ||align=left| Amadeu Cristiano || Chiang Rai WBC Muaythai Championship || Chiang Rai, Thailand || KO || 2 ||
|-
! style=background:white colspan=9 |
|-  style="background:#cfc;"
| 2013-11-23 || Win ||align=left| Ibrahima Njie || Muay Thai Warriors - España vs Tailandia || Madrid, Spain || Decision (Unanimous) || 5 || 3:00
|-  style="background:#fbb;"
| 2013-10-26 || Loss ||align=left| Toby Smith || REAL HERO - Australia vs Thailand || Sydney, Australia || Decision (Unanimous) || 3 || 3:00 
|-  style="background:#cfc;"
| 2013-06-28 || Win ||align=left| Yacine Drakrim || Muay Thai Warriors - Dabble in Chiang Mai || Chiang Mai, Thailand || Decision (Unanimous) || 5 || 3:00 
|-
! style=background:white colspan=9 |
|-  style="background:#cfc;"
| 2013-05-16 || Win ||align=left| Craig Jose || M-ONE Reborn || United Kingdom || Decision (Unanimous) || 5 || 3:00 
|-
! style=background:white colspan=9 |
|-  style="background:#cfc;"
| 2013-04-05 || Win ||align=left| Victor Nagbe || Muay Thai Warriors - Thailand vs World, Pattaya Boxing World Stadium || Pattaya, Thailand || KO(Left Elbow) || 3 ||
|-
! style=background:white colspan=9 |
|-  style="background:#cfc;"
| 2012-11-04 || Win ||align=left| Umar Semata || Muay Thai Warriors In The Relation || Phnom Penh, Cambodia || Decision || 5 || 3:00
|-
|-  style="background:#cfc;"
| 2012-06-17 || Win ||align=left| Kym Johnson || Sphinx Showdomn || North Geelong, Australia || Decision ||  || 3:00
|-
|-  style="background:#cfc;"
| 2012-05-18 || Win ||align=left| Mike 300 Demetriou ||  || Melbourne, Australia || Decision ||  || 3:00 
|-
|-  style="background:#fbb;"
| 2012-03-24 || Loss ||align=left| Singmanee Kaewsamrit || Isuzu Cup 22 Tournament Final, Omnoi Stadium || Bangkok, Thailand || Decision || 5 || 3:00 
|-
! style=background:white colspan=9 |
|-  style="background:#cfc;"
| 2012-01-14 || Win ||align=left| Iquezang Kor.Rungthanakeat || Isuzu Cup 22 Tournament Semi Final, Omnoi Stadium || Bangkok, Thailand || Decision || 5 || 3:00 
|-
|-  style="background:#cfc;"
| 2011-11-26 || Win ||align=left| Saenchainoi Pumphanmuang || Isuzu Cup 22 Tournament, Lumpinee Stadium || Bangkok, Thailand || Decision || 5 || 3:00 
|-
|-  style="background:#cfc;"
| 2011-10-22 || Win ||align=left| Petchasawin Seatransferry || Isuzu Cup 22 Tournament, Omnoi Stadium || Bangkok, Thailand || Decision || 5 || 3:00 
|-
|-  style="background:#cfc;"
| 2011-09-10 || Win ||align=left| Saksurin Kiatyongyuth || Isuzu Cup 22 Tournament, Omnoi Stadium || Bangkok, Thailand || Decision || 5 || 3:00 
|-
|-  style="background:#fbb;"
| 2011-07-01 || Loss ||align=left| Sirimongkol Sitanuparb ||  Toyota Vigo Marathon Tournament 2011, Final || Songkhla, Thailand || Decision || 3 || 3:00 
|-
! style=background:white colspan=9 |
|-  style="background:#cfc;"
| 2011-07-01 || Win ||align=left| Toofan Salafzoon ||  Toyota Vigo Marathon Tournament 2011, Semi Final || Songkhla, Thailand || TKO (Doctor Stoppage) || 2 ||  
|-
|-  style="background:#cfc;"
| 2011-07-01 || Win ||align=left|  || Toyota Vigo Marathon Tournament 2011, Quarter Final || Songkhla, Thailand ||  ||  ||  
|-
|-  style="background:#cfc;"
| 2011-05-24 || Win ||align=left| Eakpracha Meenayothin || Wanwirapon Fights, Lumpinee Stadium || Bangkok, Thailand || Decision || 3 || 3:00 
|-
|-  style="background:#cfc;"
| 2011-04-29 || Win ||align=left| Behzad Rafigh Doust ||  Prince Thailand Birthday  || Ayodhya, Thailand || Decision || 3 || 3:00 
|-
|-  style="background:#cfc;"
| 2010-10-05 || Win ||align=left| Singdam Kiatmuu9 || Lumpinee Champion Krikkrai Fights, Lumpinee Stadium || Bangkok, Thailand || Decision || 5 || 3:00 
|-
! style=background:white colspan=9 |
|-  style="background:#cfc;"
| 2010-09-07 || Win ||align=left| Pansak Look Bor.Kor || Phetsupapan Fights, Lumpinee Stadium || Bangkok, Thailand || Decision || 5 || 3:00 
|- 
|-
! style=background:white colspan=9 |
|-  style="background:#fbb;"
| 2010-08-13 || Loss ||align=left| Saenchai P.K.SenchaimuaythaiGYM || Hatyai Stadium || Hatyai, Thailand || Decision || 5 || 3:00 
|-
|-  style="background:#fbb;"
| 2010-03-05 || Loss ||align=left| Singdam Kiatmuu9 || Lumpinee Champion Krikkrai Fights, Lumpinee Stadium || Bangkok, Thailand || Decision || 5 || 3:00 
|-
|-  style="background:#cfc;"
| 2010-02-09 || Win ||align=left| Singdam Kiatmuu9 || Wanwerapon Fights, Lumpinee Stadium || Bangkok, Thailand || Decision || 5 || 3:00 
|-
|-  style="background:#cfc;"
| 2009-12-15 || Win ||align=left| Tuantong Pumphanmuang || Petsupapan Fights, Lumpinee Stadium || Bangkok, Thailand || Decision || 5 || 3:00 
|-
|-  style="background:#cfc;"
| 2009-11-24 || Win ||align=left| Pettanong Petfergus || Wanwerapon Fights, Lumpinee Stadium || Bangkok, Thailand || Decision || 5 || 3:00 
|-
|-  style="background:#cfc;"
| 2009-10-02 || Win ||align=left| Kaew Fairtex || Petsupapan Fights, Lumpinee Stadium || Bangkok, Thailand || Decision || 5 || 3:00 
|-
|-  style="background:#fbb;"
| 2009-08-11 || Loss ||align=left| Sarawuth Loogbaanyai || Petsupapan Fights, Lumpinee Stadium || Bangkok, Thailand || Decision || 5 || 3:00 
|-
|-  style="background:#cfc;"
| 2009-06-26 || Win ||align=left| Sarawuth Loogbaanyai || Petsupapan Fights, Lumpinee Stadium || Bangkok, Thailand || Decision || 5 || 3:00 
|-
|-  style="background:#cfc;"
| 2008-12-26 || Win ||align=left| Pansak Look Bor.Kor || Saengsawangpanpa Fights, Lumpinee Stadium || Bangkok, Thailand || Decision || 5 || 3:00 
|-
|-  style="background:#cfc;"
| 2008-06-03 || Win ||align=left| Dokmaipa Wor Sungprapai || Phetsupapan Fights, Lumpinee Stadium || Bangkok, Thailand || Decision || 5 || 3:00 
|-
|-  style="background:#cfc;"
| 2008-03-14 || Win ||align=left| Yodthuanthong F.A.Group || Phetpiya Fights, Lumpinee Stadium || Bangkok, Thailand || Decision || 5 || 3:00 
|-
|-  style="background:#fbb;"
| 2007-01-27 || Loss ||align=left| Sanaengam Erawan || Omnoi Stadium || Samut Sakhon, Thailand || Decision || 5 || 3:00 

|-  style="background:#fbb;"
| 2006-12-10 || Loss ||align=left| Punyai Payakkhampan || Channel 7 Stadium || Bangkok, Thailand || Decision || 5 || 3:00 

|-  style="background:#fbb;"
| 2006-09-29 || Loss ||align=left| Palangnoom Hlamthongkarnpat || Kiatphet Fights, Lumpinee Stadium || Bangkok, Thailand || Decision || 5 || 3:00 
|-
|-  style="background:#fbb;"
| 2006-08-22 || Loss ||align=left| Mongkonchai Phetsupapan || Phetsupapan Fights, Lumpinee Stadium || Bangkok, Thailand || Decision || 5 || 3:00 
|-
|-  style="background:#cfc;"
| 2006-07-28 || Win ||align=left| Kysit Chuwatana || Khunsuk Takoonyang Fights, Lumpinee Stadium || Bangkok, Thailand || Decision || 5 || 3:00 
|-
|-  style="background:#cfc;"
| 2006-06-16 || Win ||align=left| Ritijak Kaewsamrit || Phetsupapan Fights, Lumpinee Stadium || Bangkok, Thailand || Decision || 5 || 3:00 
|-
|-  style="background:#fbb;"
| 2006-04-07 || Loss ||align=left| Oley K.Kittisakgym || Phetsupapan Fights, Lumpinee Stadium || Bangkok, Thailand || TKO || 3 || 
|-
|-  style="background:#cfc;"
| 2006-02-25 || Win ||align=left| Hokoon Sitkhruwath || Muaythai Lumpinee Krikkri Fights, Lumpinee Stadium || Bangkok, Thailand || Decision || 5 || 3:00 
|-
|-  style="background:#fbb;"
| 2006-01-13 || Loss ||align=left| Denwadto S.Sommai || Phetsupapan Fights, Lumpinee Stadium || Bangkok, Thailand || Decision || 5 || 3:00 
|-
|-  style="background:#cfc;"
| 2005-10-04 || Win ||align=left| Harnpo P.Telakoon || Phetsupapan Fights, Lumpinee Stadium || Bangkok, Thailand || Decision || 5 || 3:00 
|-
| colspan=9 | Legend:    

|-  style="background:#fbb;"
| 2018-03-13 || Loss ||align=left|  Yodwicha Khemmuaythaigym || Army Games 68 ||  Thailand || Decision || 3 || 3:00 
|-
|-  style="background:#cfc;"
| 2017-07-30 || Win ||align=left| Masoud Minaei ||  I.F.M.A. World Muaythai at The World Games 2017, Finals -71 kg || Wroclaw, Poland || Decision || 3 || 3:00 
|-
! style=background:white colspan=9 |
|-  style="background:#cfc;"
| 2017-07-29 || Win ||align=left| Gabriel Mazzetti ||  I.F.M.A. World Muaythai at The World Games 2017, Semi Finals -71 kg || Wroclaw, Poland || Decision (Unanimous) || 3 || 3:00
|-  style="background:#cfc;"
| 2017-07-28 || Win ||align=left| Dimitar Markov ||  I.F.M.A. World Muaythai at The World Games 2017, Quarter Finals -71 kg || Wroclaw, Poland || TKO (Knee to the body) || 1 || 
|-  style="background:#cfc;"
| 2017-05-12 || Win ||align=left| Vadim Vaskov || I.F.M.A. World Muaythai Championships 2017, Finals -71 kg || Minsk, Belarus || Walkover ||  ||  
|-
! style=background:white colspan=9 |
|-  style="background:#cfc;"
| 2017-05-10 || Win ||align=left| Habib Abdallah || I.F.M.A. World Muaythai Championships 2017, Semi Finals -71 kg || Minsk, Belarus || Decision (Unanimous) || 3 || 3:00
|-  style="background:#cfc;"
| 2017-05-08 || Win ||align=left| Kosykh Ivan || I.F.M.A. World Muaythai Championships 2017, Quarter Finals -71 kg || Minsk, Belarus || TKO (Corner Stoppage) || 1 || 
|-  style="background:#cfc;"
| 2017-05-06 || Win ||align=left| Taaouati Soufiane || I.F.M.A. World Muaythai Championships 2017, Eighth Finals -71 kg || Minsk, Belarus || KO (Flying High Kick) || 2 || 
|-  style="background:#cfc;"
| 2016-05-29 || Win ||align=left| Sean Kearney || I.F.M.A. World Muaythai Championships 2016, Finals -71 kg || Jönköping, Sweden || Decision (Unanimous) || 3 || 3:00
|-
! style=background:white colspan=9 |
|-
|-  style="background:#cfc;"
| 2016-05-26 || Win ||align=left| Andrei Kulebin || I.F.M.A. World Muaythai Championships 2016, Semi Finals -71 kg || Jönköping, Sweden || Decision (Unanimous) || 3 || 3:00
|-
|-  style="background:#cfc;"
| 2016-05-23 || Win ||align=left| Stomatov Oleksandr || I.F.M.A. World Muaythai Championships 2016, Quarter Finals -71 kg || Jönköping, Sweden || Decision (Unanimous) || 3 || 3:00
|-
|-  style="background:#cfc;"
| 2015-08-23|| Win ||align=left| Andrei Kulebin || I.F.M.A. Royal World cup Tournament 2015, Finals -71 kg || Bangkok, Thailand || Decision || 3 || 3:00 
|- 
! style=background:white colspan=9 | 
|-  style="background:#cfc;"
| 2015-08-21|| Win ||align=left| Oleksandr Moisa || I.F.M.A. Royal World cup Tournament 2015, Semi Finals -71 kg || Bangkok, Thailand ||  ||  || 
|-  
|-  style="background:#cfc;"
| 2015-08-17|| Win ||align=left| Kosykh Ivan || I.F.M.A. Royal World cup Tournament 2015, Quarter Finals -71 kg || Bangkok, Thailand ||  ||  || 
|-  
|-  style="background:#cfc;"
| 2015-08-14|| Win ||align=left| Hellevaara Teemu || I.F.M.A. Royal World cup Tournament 2015, Eighth Finals -71 kg || Bangkok, Thailand ||  ||  || 
|-
| colspan=9 | Legend:

References

External links
ONE Championship profile

Superbon Singha Mawynn
Living people
1990 births
Superbon Singha Mawynn
Kunlun Fight kickboxers
ONE Championship kickboxers
Kickboxing champions
Kunlun Fight kickboxing champions
ONE Championship champions